Fernando Gabriel Olivera Génova (born 30 April 1998) is a Uruguayan footballer who plays as a midfielder for Rentistas in the Uruguayan Primera División.

Career

Rentistas
Olivera made his league debut for the club on 3 March 2018, playing the entirety of a 1-0 away defeat to Villa Teresa.

References

1998 births
Living people
C.A. Rentistas players
Uruguayan Segunda División players
Uruguayan footballers
Association football midfielders
Footballers from Montevideo